This is a list of universities and colleges in Somaliland'''. It includes both public and private institutions.

|-
|Iqra Institute for Higher Education
|Badhan
|English 
|2008
|
|
|
|
|}
Sahal University Las Anod  English       2017

References

Somaliland education-related lists
Somaliland
Somaliland